El Renacimiento was a bilingual Spanish–Tagalog language newspaper. It was printed in Manila until the 1940s by the members of the Guerrero de Ermita family. Its directors were Fernando Ma. Guerrero, Teodoro M. Kalaw, and Rafael Palma and its editors were Wenceslao Retana, Javier Gomez de la Serna, Dominador Gomez, Isabelo de los Reyes, and Felipe Calderon.

The paper was first published on September 3, 1901, and was founded as a response to the signing of the Treaty of Paris, which derailed the Philippines' struggle for sovereignty. The paper was openly critical of the United States' colonial regime and its policies.

The paper shut down due to official pressure after publishing an editorial that dealt with corruption in the colonial government. It was re-established by Don Martin Ocampo, who had been the business manager and principal owner, under the name of La Vanguardia, with Taliba as its Tagalog edition.

Aves de Rapiña 
On October 30, 1908, El Renacimiento published an editorial entitled "Aves de Rapiña" ("Bird of Prey"), which dealt with corruption in the colonial government.

The newspaper was sued for libel by Dean Conant Worcester, then-secretary of the interior of the Insular Government of the Philippines. Worcester felt he was alluded to by the description of someone who had "the characteristics of the vulture, the owl and the vampire." According to historian Ambeth Ocampo, Worcester allegedly used his position as interior secretary to profit from the sale of diseased beef. He was also alleged to have profited from overpriced hotel concessions on government land.

Worcester's lawsuit pushed the paper toward bankruptcy, which led to the paper's closure. Kalaw and publisher Martin Ocampo were sentenced to prison. However, the two were given pardons in 1914 by Governor-General Francis Burton Harrison.

The essay has become part of the required reading list in Philippine colleges. El Renacimiento is remembered as an anti-colonial publication that fought for press freedom during the American colonial period.

References

Newspapers published in Metro Manila
Spanish-language newspapers
Publications established in 1901
National newspapers published in the Philippines
Defunct newspapers published in the Philippines
Censorship in the Philippines

External links
 Scanned copies hosted at the digital collections website of the University of Santo Tomas Miguel de Benavides Library